Lee O-young (15 January 1934 – 26 February 2022) was a South Korean critic and novelist. Although the romanized spelling of the hangul name "이어령" might be Yi O-ryŏng or Lee Eo-ryeong, Lee O-young is the author's preferred romanization according to the Literature Translation Institute of Korea.

Life and career
Lee O-young was born on 15 January 1934, (other sources say 29 December 1933) in Asan, Chungcheongnam-do, South Korea. Lee went to Buyeo High School and Seoul National University from which he received undergraduate (1956) and graduate (1959) degrees in Korean literature. Lee has taught at Ewha Womans University, where he was a professor emeritus, and Dankook University. Lee has been the chief editor of Munhak sasang (Literary Thought) and the Korean Minister of Culture.

He died from cancer on 26 February 2022, at the age of 88.

Work
Lee was one of the most prominent figures to emerge from the "post-war generation" of Korean critics. Making his mark with his first piece of literary criticism, "Lee Sang non" ("On Lee Sang", 1955), he caused a stir in literary circles with his next essay, "Usang eui pagoe" ("Destruction of an Idol"), published in Hankook Ilbo in 1956. At a time when the war experience seemed to have devastated the literary imagination as well, Lee argued for the expansion and enrichment of Korean literature in articles that featured considerable rhetorical sophistication and verve.

Literary works

Translated works
 The General's Beard (장군의 수염 )

Works in Korean (partial)
Critical collections
 Jeohang eui munhak (Literature of Resistance, 1959)
 Jeonhu munhag eui saemulgyeol (The New Wave of Postwar Literature)
 Tonggeum sidae eui munhak (Literature in the Age of Curfew)
Fiction
 Janggun eui suyeom (The General's Beard)
 Amsalja (The Assassin)
 Jeonjaeng Dekameron (Wartime Decameron)
 Hwangag eui dari (Phantom Legs)
Essays
 Heuk soge jeo baram soge (In This Earth & In That Wind: This Is Korea, 1963)
 Sin han kuk in (New Korean, 1986)
 Chook so ji hyange ilbonin (Japanese people who are scaled down, 2008)
 Digilog (digilog, 2006)
 Jisunge Osolgil (The path of the intellect, 2004)
 Jisung esu youngsung euro (From intellect to spirituality, 2017)

Received awards
Lee has won a variety of Korean awards.
 1979: Korean Award for Culture and Art (대한민국 문화예술상)
 1992: Award for Design Culture of Japan (일본 디자인문화상)
 1996: 24th Award of Japan for International Exchange (제24회 일본 국제교류기금 대상)
 2001: Cultural Award of Seoul (서울시문화상, 문학부문)
 2003: 48th Award of the Korean Council for Art (제48회 대한민국 예술원상, 문학부문)
 2007: 2nd Mask of Respect Award (제2회 마크 오브 리스펙트상)
 2009: 2nd Grand Award for Korean People, category for literature (제2회 한민족문화예술대상 문학부문상)
 2009: International Masaoka Shiki Award (마사오카 시키 국제 하이쿠상)
 2011: 20th Sochung Saseon Culture Award, special award (제20회 소충 사선문화상 특별상)
 2011: 24th Christian Culture Award, special award in literature (제24회 기독교문화대상 시상식 문학 특상)

References 

1934 births
2022 deaths
20th-century South Korean writers
21st-century South Korean writers
South Korean novelists
South Korean literary critics
Culture ministers of South Korea
Seoul National University alumni
Academic staff of Dankook University
Academic staff of Ewha Womans University
South Korean Presbyterians
People from Asan
Dankook University alumni